Peter Bazálik (born 14 June 1975) is a Slovak cyclist. He competed at the 1996 Summer Olympics, the 2000 Summer Olympics and the 2004 Summer Olympics.

References

1975 births
Living people
Slovak male cyclists
Olympic cyclists of Slovakia
Cyclists at the 1996 Summer Olympics
Cyclists at the 2000 Summer Olympics
Cyclists at the 2004 Summer Olympics
People from Banská Štiavnica
Sportspeople from the Banská Bystrica Region